The third season of Wizards of Waverly Place aired on Disney Channel from October 9, 2009, to October 15, 2010. The Russo children, Alex (Selena Gomez), Justin (David Henrie), and Max Russo (Jake T. Austin) continue to compete to become the leading wizard in their family and meet many friends and adversaries along the way. Maria Canals Barrera and David DeLuise co-star as their parents and Jennifer Stone co-stars as Alex's best friend, Harper Finkle. This is the first season of the series to be broadcast in high-definition. This is also the final season to play the original version of the series theme song.

Opening sequence
The opening sequence is the same as it was for the previous seasons. The characters in the opening sequence still remain in Standard Definition, only the background being converted to high definition.

The sequence begins with Alex (Selena Gomez) waking up in the morning with her alarm clock buzzing off. She uses a spell to make the time 6:30. She then goes into the bathroom where Justin (David Henrie) is observing himself in the mirror where Alex pushes him to the side. He gets annoyed and then uses magic to put her into the mirror. In the kitchen, Max (Jake T. Austin) has an orange which turns into a vanilla cupcake. Meanwhile, Harper (Jennifer Stone) meets Alex at the front door while pointing at her watermelon shirt. Back at the kitchen, Max is about to put his cupcake into his backpack when his mother, Teresa (Maria Canals Barrera), makes him turn it back into an orange. Alex tells her mother that she is late for school. In the lair, Jerry (David DeLuise) has his spellbook fly away. He then goes to retrieve it. In the sub shop, Alex opens her book bag and the spellbook goes in. Jerry lectures her as the main title card appears. Then the four friends walk to school.

Synopsis
Justin is now a graduated wizard and no longer needs to take wizard training classes with his fellow siblings. Alex now feels the need to step her training skills with a little help from Harper who now lives with the Russos. Justin also continues his relationship with a vampire named Juliet (Bridgit Claire Mendler) and Alex starts a new one with a werewolf named Mason (Gregg Sulkin). Both relationships end badly, with Juliet being transformed to look her real age and Mason turned permanently into a wolf. However, Justin has moved on with help from Harper and Alex, who has resumed her relationship with Mason after "country magic" restores him to human form. Justin attempts to fulfill a number of achievements he thinks make up a successful senior year at high school, including joining the basketball team, being elected student body president, hosting a big party, and winning the science fair with a water powered engine. Meanwhile, Alex meets a teenage wizard named Stevie Nichols (Hayley Kiyoko), who generals the same personality as Alex. Alex and Stevie become friends, much to Harper's dismay. Then, Stevie begins a wizard revolution and Alex tricks her into joining the revolution to freeze Stevie and transport her powers to her brother, Warren. Max then destroys Stevie by accident. Alex has romance going off and on in this season. Max falls for his first girlfriend. The season finale has the family kidnapped by government agents for being wizards. Tricked into believing an alien invasion is coming, Justin tells the agents magic exists, leading to most wizards being captured. The Russos manage to escape with Alex declaring they need to tell the world the truth to save the wizard world.

Guest stars and recurring cast include: Bill Chott as Mr. Laritate, Dan Benson as Zeke Beakerman, Hayley Kiyoko as Stevie Nichols, Bridgit Claire Mendler as Juliet Van Heusen, Moisés Arias as Conscience, Bella Thorne as Nancy Lukey, Fred Willard as Mr. Stuffleby, Austin Butler as George, Shakira as Herself, Ted McGinley as Magroder, John O'Hurley as Captain Jim Bob Sherwood, Wilmer Valderrama as Uncle Ernesto, Kate Flannery as Elaine Finkle, and Jeff Garlin as Uncle Kelbo.

Cast 
Selena Gomez as Alex Russo
David Henrie as Justin Russo
Jake T. Austin as Max Russo
Jennifer Stone as Harper Finkle
Maria Canals Barrera as Theresa Russo
David DeLuise as Jerry Russo

Episodes

References

2009 American television seasons
2010 American television seasons
Wizards of Waverly Place